The Communauté de communes Entre Mer et Lin was located in the Seine-Maritime département of the Normandy region of northern France. It was created in December 2001. It was merged into the Communauté de communes de la Côte d'Albâtre in January 2017.

Participants 
The Communauté de communes comprised the following 17 communes:

Angiens 
Anglesqueville-la-Bras-Long 
Autigny 
Le Bourg-Dun
Bourville 
Brametot 
La Chapelle-sur-Dun 
Crasville-la-Rocquefort 
Ermenouville 
Fontaine-le-Dun 
La Gaillarde 
Héberville 
Houdetot 
Saint-Aubin-sur-Mer
Saint-Pierre-le-Vieux
Saint-Pierre-le-Viger
Sotteville-sur-Mer

See also
Communes of the Seine-Maritime department

References 

Entre Mer et Lin